The Martin County School System in a United States school district located in Martin County, Kentucky.  The superintendent is Larry James. The district headquarters is in Inez.

Schools
Secondary schools:
Martin County High School. This facility opened in the 2019–2020 school year. The current principal is Martha Williams and the assistant principal is Jason James. 
Martin County Middle School is located in the former Warfield Middle School building; the school opened as Warfield in 1997 and became Martin County Middle School in 2013. The current principal is Brent Haney. (Warfield)
Elementary schools:
Eden Elementary School is a public primary school located in an unincorporated area near Inez. It was founded after Tomahawk Elementary School and Grassy Elementary School were closed in 2002. The principal of the school is Shane Stafford. The school was named Eden after the previous name of Inez.
Inez Elementary School was opened in 1936. New Building was opened in 1984. Additions to this building were later built from 2007 to 2010. The current principal is Amanda Branham Fields. (unincorporated area)
Warfield Elementary School was opened in 1934 with a new building opened in 1986 Additions built from 2007 to 2010. The current principal is Brian Charles.   (unincorporated area)
It is in a campus built sometime in the 1980s. It is on Route 292, north of the Warfield city limits.  the school had about 340 students, 28 certified employees, and 29 other employees.

Former schools
High schools:
 Inez High School opened 1936 (Was called Martin County High School before 1936) was shut down in 1972 after consolidation to form Sheldon Clark.
 Warfield High School opened 1934 was shut down in 1972 after consolidation to form Sheldon Clark.
Sheldon Clark High School opened 1972 was shut down in 2019. Due to new Martin County High School facility opening.
 Inez Middle School (Unincorporated area) Opened 1978 was shut down in 2013 Was located in former Inez High School and Elementary building until new building was opened in 1993. Building formerly housed  the temporary location of Sheldon Clark High School. As of 2020 it houses White Oak Hill which part of Addiction Recovery Care (ARC) 
 Warfield Middle School (Warfield) Opened in 1978 Was located in former Warfield High School and Elementary Building until 1997 when the Current Building was built Warfield Middle School was shut down in 2013. This building was turned into Martin County Middle School.

Elementary schools:
 Grassy Elementary School Opened in 1960 was closed in 2002 due to consolidation with Tomahawk to form Eden Elementary. 
 Pigeon Roost Elementary School Opened in 1960 was closed in 2004 due to flooding. Students went to Warfield Elementary. 
 Tomahawk Elementary School Opened in 1940 was closed 2002 due to consolidation with Grassy to form Eden Elementary.
 Turkey Elementary School Opened in 1960 was closed in 1997. Students went to either Inez Elementary or Warfield Elementary.
 Venters Branch Elementary School Opened in 1960 was closed in 1992 to form the Martin County Alternative School. This school was the smallest out of the 4 Schools that were built in 1960. With only 4 classrooms. Students went to Inez Elementary 
Other:
 Martin County Alternative School (Debord) - In the Venters Branch School Opened in 1992 Closed 1997 Students went to portable classrooms behind Sheldon Clark after closure. This location housed students from grades 6 to 12. The mascot of the School was the Explorers.

Martin County Area Technology Center
Martin County Area Technology Center was opened in 1967 and is operated by Kentucky Tech. This original building was the first constructed with the plan that built Sheldon Clark High School. The Vocational School was originally affiliated with the Mayo State Vocational School. Throughout the years there had been various name changes and program changes. Some of the different names. Were the Martin County Vocational School, Martin County Vocational Education Center besides what is currently offered. Students were able to take Drafting and Mining Classes that were eventually phased out. But the mission of the Martin County ATC Is still being offered to students to get them career ready and to go into the workforce.  The current principal of the facility is Chad Williams. The school focuses on vocational trades, nursing, IT, carpentry, electricity, and office technology.. The New Martin County Area Technology Center Building opened in 2020. It is located at the site of the current Martin County High School. The Former Area Technology Center built in 1967 Currently houses the Martin County Board of Education district offices.
They are currently 5 teachers in the facility, along with 1 custodian, 1 administrative assistant and the principal.

References

External links
 Martin County School System homepage
 
 

Education in Martin County, Kentucky
School districts in Kentucky